Marshallenidae is a family of small to medium-sized sea snails, marine gastropod mollusks in the superfamily Conoidea.

Genera
 Marshallena Finlay, 1926

References

External links
 Abdelkrim J., Aznar-Cormano L., Fedosov A., Kantor Y., Lozouet P., Phuong M., Zaharias P. & Puillandre N. (2018). Exon-capture based phylogeny and diversification of the venomous gastropods (Neogastropoda, Conoidea). Molecular Biology and Evolution. 35(10): 2355-2374

 
Conoidea